Eressa discinota is a moth of the family Erebidae. It was described by Frederic Moore in 1879. It is found in India (Assam, Tenasserim).

References

Eressa
Moths described in 1879